Maratha are the Marathi people of India.

Maratha or Marathas may also refer to:

 Maratha (Arcadia), a village of ancient Arcadia
 Maratha (caste), an Indian caste in Maharashtra, India
 Maratha, Cyprus, a village
 Maratha Empire (1674–1818), an empire that dominated a large portion of the Indian subcontinent

See also
 
 Marathwada, a region of Maharashtra, India
 Marathi (disambiguation)